Noëlle Lenoir (born 27 April 1948) is a French lawyer, former judge, and politician.

Career

Noëlle Lenoir was born in Neuilly-sur-Seine. She is a graduate of Sciences Po and the Paris Law Faculty. She has been a professor in each of these institutions.  After qualifying as a lawyer and the achievement of the Senate administrator competition, she was appointed, from 1972 to 1982, at the law Committee of the French Senate. During her time at the Senate, she was in charge of not only the Justice budget, but also the follow up and review of criminal law, immigration law, and human rights law. Following 10 years at the High Assembly, Noelle Lenoir joined the regulation management of the newly formed national data protection authority Commission for Information Technology and Civil Liberties (Commission Nationale de l'Informatique et des Libertés (CNIL) as Chief Legal Officer, from 1982 until 1984. She followed the implementation of the French Data Processing and Liberty Law and she particularly focused on marketing, health data and the applicability of the law in the Scientific and Statistics domains as well as transborder on transfers of data in addition to enquiries by the CNIL.

In 1984, she joined the Council of State (the Conseil d'État is the French administrative Supreme Court) where she was appointed 'Rapporteur Public" (Advocate general). In 1988, she was appointed as Chief of Staff for the Ministry of Justice, where she served until 1990. In 1990, the French government appointed Lenoir to review French bioethics law.  Her report to the Prime Minister, Michel Rocard, titled "Aux Frontières de la Vie:  Pour une éthique biomedicale à la Française" provided the foundation and adoption of the first French bioethics law.

She was appointed as the first woman and youngest person to the French Constitutional Council, where she served the Court's nine-year term from 1992 to 2001.

Aside from being a constitutional Justice, Noelle Lenoir chaired the UNESCO International Bioethics Committee and drafted the Human Genome and Human Rights Declaration, which the United Nations endorsed in 1998 on the 50th anniversary of the Universal Declaration of Human Rights.  In 1991, she is also appointed by the European Commission presided by Jacques Delors as a member of the European Ethics and Science & Technology Group (GEE).  Then, in 1994, she is elected as President of this group and reelected by its members twice.

She left her position at the GEE in 2000 to travel to the United States where she was, an adjunct law professor at the Law university of Columbia, New York City before joining the Paris Bar in 2001, Noëlle Lenoir was appointed in 2002 Junior Minister for European Affairs by Prime Minister Jean-Pierre Raffarin. During her tenure she was involved in a number of negotiations with central and oriental European countries on their way to join the European Union and the follow-up of the constitutional treaty. In addition, she defended France's positions on various European proposals and legislation.
Finally, she is the first woman appointed, with her counterpart the German minister of European affairs, to the position of General Secretary for France-German Cooperation (SGFA).

Noëlle Lenoir joined Debevoise & Plimpton LLP's the Paris office as Of-Counsel in 2004.
In 2006–2007 she was appointed by the French Minister of Justice to conduct an evaluation of the status of the European Company (SE) (report delivered on 19 March 2007).

Noëlle Lenoir joined JeantetAssociés in 2009 as a partner where she headed the European department (competition law, litigation and regulatory).

In January 2012, she joined the Paris office of Kramer Levin Naftalis & Frankel LLP as a partner where she currently heads the Compliance department, dealing with regulatory and public affairs law at the national level and European level.  She also specializes in competition law, and data protection and cyber security law, covering a wide scope of areas in this respect such as data breach prevention and incident response, government and internal investigations, cross-border data transfer and e-discovery, controllers' and processors' liability, global compliance and risk management, privacy policies and EU data counseling, consumer protection and class action litigation defense as well as advertising and internet marketing.  She also advises on confidential business information and misappropriation of trade secrets as well as on matters in relation with the blocking statute.
Between 22 May 2017 and 30 April 2020, she was a member of the panel of independent experts or ICRP (along with Theo Waigel, former Finance Minister of Germany, and Lord Gold) designated by Airbus to examine the compliance within the company and monitor the improvements needed.

After having been appointed by the French Minister of Justice, she acted as Commissioner under the 1970 Hague Convention on the taking of evidence abroad in civil and commercial matters in charge of ensuring compliance of the discovery process set up in relation with the tragic fire at the Grenfell Apartment complex in London with the French Blocking Statute and GDPR.

In July 2020, she created her own law firm – Noëlle Lenoir Avocats – and was referenced by Décideurs among the 30 best lawyers.

Current educational activities / think tank

Noëlle Lenoir taught at Sciences-Po Paris and the Faculty of law of Paris (apart from Columbia Law School and University College London). She is currently an Associate Professor and President of the European Institute at the Hautes Etudes de Commerce in Paris.

Furthermore, she is the Founder and President of Cercle des Européens, a think-tank which operates as an ideas exchange group on socioeconomic and political stakes of the 21st century Europe. Cercle des Européens is known as a place where French and European decision makers can meet for roundtable discussions on different European problems and subjects. Noelle Lenoir is also President of the Comité Droit et Débat Public, which gathers lawyers interested in popularization of legal issues.
She was also a member of the EC High Level Experts group on the European company law at the Commission level. She created in 2017 a European network "Ministers For Europe" (MFE) gathering former minister of Foreign or European Affairs to exchange views and publish common op-ed on European issues.

Mandates

Noëlle Lenoir was administrator of Generali France (2008–2012), Compagnie des Alpes (2012–2018) and Valeo (2009–2019). She is currently administrator of Sopra-Steria.

She became a local representative of the City of Valmandois (Val d'Oise) for the first time in 1977. By 1989 she was elected mayor of Valmondois until 1995, a post she had to abandon in favor of her mandate as a justice of the French Constitutional Court.  She ran again for the mayor in 2008 and was reelected with her complete list.  Lenoir stayed Mayor of Valmondois from 2008 through 2010, where she resigned for personal reasons. In this capacity she was vice-president of the Community of Cities of the District of "Sausseron", member of the Steering Committee of the Association of France Mayors, as well as member of the Legal Committee of "Concessions – Délégations de service public" of the Delegate Management Institute. She is member of the Board of the Association of French Constitutional lawyers and of the Society for Comparative Law.

She was appointed by the Bureau of the French National Assembly as Chief Ethics Officer (2012–2014).

She was appointed as Chairman of the Radio France Ethics Committee (2017–2018).

She was appointed as Chairman of the Scientific and Ethics Committee of the Parcoursup platform by an order issued by the French Minister of Higher Education and Research. This committee is due to deliver an annual report on the functioning of this platform to the Parliament (2018–2019).

She is the Vice President of the French Committee of the International Chamber of Commerce (ICC France – since 2017).

Other pro bono functions

 Member of the American Law Institute
 Distinguished Fellow of the Hastings Center
 Member of the French Academy of Technology

Press / media

Mrs Lenoir is a columnist on European matters for a variety of French newspapers. She was editor for the BFM radio station, France-Culture radio,France 24 TV station in partnership with HEC. She was responsible for the "Europe" blog of the L'Express weekly magazine till 2020.  She has made several publications about the caricaturist Honoré Daumier. She is honorary President of the Society for the Friends of Daumier which she created in 1994.

Among others:

 La Transparence administrative (en coll., 1987) with Bruno Lasserre and Bernard Stirn)
 Aux Frontières de la Vie : une Ethique Biomédicale à la Française.
 Les Normes Internationales de la Bioéthique (1998)
 Relever le défi des Biogechnologies (2000)
 La Justice, de Daumier à nos jours (1999)
 La Vie Politique, de Daumier à nos jours (2005)
 La Societas Europaea ou SE : Pour une Citoyenneté Européenne de l'Entreprise (2007)
 L'Europe, de Daumier à nos jours (2017)

Distinctions

 Grand Officier de l'Ordre national du Mérite (France)
 Officier de la Légion d'Honneur (France)
 Grand Officier de l'Ordre de Léopold II (Belgique)
 Commandeur de l'Ordre du Mérite (Pologne)
 Commandeur de l'Ordre du Mérite de la République fédérale d'Allemagne (Allemagne)

Other distinctions

 Honoris Causa, Suffolk University (USA);
 Honoris Causa, University College London (UK)

Teaching

Competition law and European Law at Paris 1 Panthéon-Sorbonne University

Areas of practice

 Compliance, Environmental Social Responsibility, Anticorruption and International investigations at National and International level
 Public Business Law and Constitutional Law
 Data Protection, Privacy and Cybersecurity
 European and Competition Law
 Litigation
 Regulatory

References

External links 
 Le Cercle des Européens
 Report on the European Company statute (SE)commissioned by the French Minister of Justice
Noëlle Lenoir's opinion editorial commentaries for Project Syndicate

1948 births
Living people
People from Neuilly-sur-Seine
Politicians of the French Fifth Republic
Hastings Center Fellows
Women government ministers of France
Sciences Po alumni
Members of the Conseil d'État (France)
Officiers of the Légion d'honneur
Grand Officers of the Ordre national du Mérite
Mayors of places in Île-de-France